In the taxonomy of microorganisms, the Methanothrix are a genus of the Euryarchaeota.

Phylogeny

See also
 List of Archaea genera

References

Archaea genera